Chris-Pin Martin (born Ysabel Ponciana Chris-Pin Martin Paiz, November 19, 1893 – June 27, 1953) was an American character actor whose specialty lay in portraying comical Mexicans, particularly sidekicks in The Cisco Kid film series. He acted in over 100 films between 1925 and 1953, including over 50 westerns.

Biography
Martin was born in Tucson, Arizona. His roles were as a bumbling or slow comedic character who spoke in broken English. His most remembered western film role was in nine of the Cisco Kid films playing the Kid's sidekicks Gordito and in the later films Pancho. He also appeared in the John Ford classic Stagecoach (1939) with John Wayne. He was credited in his films by other names, including Chrispin Martin, Chris King Martin, Chris Martin, Cris-Pin Martin, and Ethier Crispin Martini.

Martin was adept in both drama and comedy, in films like the melodramatic The Ox-Bow Incident (1943) as "Poncho" the Mexican who reluctantly becomes a part of a lynch mob and a contrite confessor. In A Millionaire for Christy (1951) Martin plays a brief but memorable role as "Manolo", a Mexican who knows no English.

Death
Less than five months before his 60th birthday, Martin died of a heart attack while addressing a Moose lodge meeting in the Los Angeles suburb of Montebello. He is buried at the Odd Fellows Cemetery on Whittier Blvd, in East Los Angeles.

Selected filmography

The Lost World (1925) - (scenes deleted)
The Gold Rush (1925) - Man in Dance Hall (uncredited)
Border Vengeance (1925) - Bartender (uncredited)
Lord Jim (1925) - One of Brown's Crewmen (uncredited)
Cactus Trails (1925) - Bartender (uncredited)
The Temptress (1926) - Argentine Ranch Hand (uncredited)
The Night of Love (1927) - Gypsy (uncredited)
The Gaucho (1927) - Minor Role (uncredited)
In Old Arizona (1928)
The Crowd (1928) - Worker in Hallway (uncredited)
Across to Singapore (1928) - Sailor from the Santa Rosa (uncredited)
The Rescue (1929) - Tenga
Where East Is East (1929) - Native Hunter (uncredited)
Condemned (1929) - Monkey Seller (uncredited)
Under a Texas Moon (1930) - Pancho (uncredited)
The Fighting Legion (1930) - Henchman (uncredited)
The Big House (1930) - Inmate (uncredited)
 Wings of Adventure (1930) - Lopez (uncredited)
Billy the Kid (1930) - Don Esteban Santiago
The Lash (1930) - Caballero (uncredited)
Strangers May Kiss (1931) - Mexican (uncredited)
Transgression (1931) - Eduardo, the Mail Carrier (uncredited)
Nuit d'Espagne (1931) - (uncredited)
The Squaw Man (1931) - Spanish Pete - Hawkins' Henchman
Lasca of the Rio Grande (1931) - (uncredited)
The Cisco Kid (1931) - Gordito
Safe in Hell (1931) - Jury Member (uncredited)
 South of Santa Fe (1932) - Pedro
Girl of the Rio (1932) - (uncredited)
Girl Crazy (1932) - Pete
The Broken Wing (1932) - Mexican Husband
Destry Rides Again (1932) - Lopez (uncredited)
The Stoker (1932) - Chief of Police
Winner Take All (1932) - Pice's Manager in Tijuana (uncredited)
The Painted Woman (1932) - Francois Marquette aka Frenchy
Flaming Gold (1932) - Chris - Oil Well Foreman (uncredited)
Outlaw Justice (1932) - El Diablo 
The Mask of Fu Manchu (1932) - Potentate (uncredited)
Terror Trail (1933) - Jose (uncredited)
The California Trail (1933) - Pancho
Central Airport (1933) - Havana Air Port worker (uncredited)
I Loved You Wednesday (1933) - Chris - the Waiter (uncredited)
The Man from Monterey (1933) - Manuel (uncredited)
The Last Trail (1933) - Mexican Officer (uncredited)
Four Frightened People (1934) - Native Boatman
Heat Lightning (1934) - Mexican Husband with Family (uncredited)
Lazy River (1934) - Raoul (uncredited)
Viva Villa! (1934) - Peón (scenes deleted)
Rawhide Mail (1934) - Pedro Esteban
Grand Canary (1934) - Henchman (uncredited)
La Cucaracha (1934, Short) - Chiquita's Fan in Cafe (uncredited)
Chained (1934) - Peón (uncredited)
Marie Galante (1934) - Furniture Dealer (uncredited)
The Marines Are Coming (1934) - Carlos, Aide to the Torch (uncredited)
The Cactus Kid (1935) - Gambler (uncredited)
Bordertown (1935) - José (uncredited)
In Caliente (1935) - Mariachi (uncredited)
Under the Pampas Moon (1935) - Pietro
Red Salute (1935) - Men's Room Attendant (uncredited)
Hi, Gaucho! (1935) - Marco (uncredited)
Escape from Devil's Island (1935) - Goat Herder (uncredited)
Coronado (1935) - Mexican (uncredited)
Captain Blood (1935) - Sentry (uncredited)
The Border Patrolman (1936) - Mexican Giving Directions (uncredited)
The Gay Desperado (1936) - Pancho
A Tenderfoot Goes West (1936) - Pedro
The Bold Caballero (1936) - Hangman
When You're in Love (1937) - Servant (uncredited)
Swing High, Swing Low (1937) - Sleepy Servant (uncredited)
Under Strange Flags (1937) - Lopez
A Star Is Born (1937) - José Rodriguez (uncredited)
Boots and Saddles (1937) - Juan
The Hurricane (1937) - Sailor (uncredited)
Zorro Rides Again (1937, Serial) - Pedro - Wagon Driver [Ch. 1] (uncredited)
Wallaby Jim of the Islands (1937) - Mike
Born to Be Wild (1938) - Garcia (uncredited)
Four Men and a Prayer (1938) - Sergeant in Marlanda (uncredited)
Blockade (1938) - Cantina Patron (uncredited)
Tropic Holiday (1938) - Pancho
I'm From the City (1938) - Mexican Ranch Hand (uncredited)
The Texans (1938) - Juan Rodriguez (uncredited)
Billy the Kid Returns (1938) - Desk Clerk (uncredited)
Too Hot to Handle (1938) - Pedro (uncredited)
The Renegade Ranger (1938) - Felipe (uncredited)
Flirting with Fate (1938) - Solado
Stagecoach (1939) - Chris, innkeeper (uncredited)
Rough Riders' Round-up (1939) - Ramon (uncredited)
Frontier Pony Express (1939) - Deer Lodge Station Agent (uncredited)
The Return of the Cisco Kid (1939) - Gordito
Man of Conquest (1939) - Massacre Survivor (uncredited)
Code of the Secret Service (1939) - Mexican Pottery Proprietor (uncredited)
The Girl and the Gambler (1939) - Pasqual
Frontier Marshal (1939) - Pete
The Fighting Gringo (1939) - Felipe - Barber
Espionage Agent (1939) - Tunisian Guard (uncredited)
Rio (1939) - Roberto's Ranch Foreman (uncredited)
The Llano Kid (1939) - Sixto
The Cisco Kid and the Lady (1939) - Gordito
Charlie Chan in Panama (1940) - Sergeant Montero
Viva Cisco Kid (1940) - Gordito
Lucky Cisco Kid (1940) - Gordito
The Gay Caballero (1940) - Gordito
Down Argentine Way (1940) - Esteban
Mark of Zorro (1940) - Turnkey
Charter Pilot (1940) - Captain of Police (uncredited)
Romance of the Rio Grande (1940) - Gordito
The Bad Man (1941) - Pedro
Ride on Vaquero (1941) - Gordito
Week-End in Havana (1941) - Driver
Tombstone, the Town Too Tough to Die (1942) - Chris
Undercover Man (1942) - Miguel
American Empire (1942) - Augustin- Beauchard Henchman
The Ox-Bow Incident (1943) - Poncho
The Sultan's Daughter (1943) - Merchant
Ali Baba and the Forty Thieves (1944) - Fat Thief
Tampico (1944) - Waiter at Wedding Party (uncredited)
Along Came Jones (1944) - Store Proprietor (uncredited)
San Antonio (1945) - Jaime Rosas (uncredited)
The Gay Cavalier (1946)
Perilous Holiday (1946) - Store Proprietor (uncredited)
Suspense (1946) - Mexican Waiter (uncredited)
Holiday in Mexico (1946) - (uncredited)
Gallant Journey (1946) - Pedro Lopez (uncredited)
The Lone Wolf in Mexico (1947) - Cab Driver (uncredited)
The Beginning or the End (1947) - Mexican Man (uncredited)
The Secret Life of Walter Mitty (1947) - Waiter (uncredited)
Robin Hood of Monterey (1947) - Pancho
King of the Bandits (1947) - Pancho
The Fugitive (1947) - An Organ-Grinder
Pirates of Monterey (1947) - Caretta Man (uncredited)
Captain from Castile (1947) - Sancho Lopez (uncredited)
Old Los Angeles (1948) - Waiter (uncredited)
The Return of Wildfire (1948) - Pancho
Blood on the Moon (1948) - Commisary Bartender (uncredited)
Belle Starr's Daughter (1948) - Spanish George
Mexican Hayride (1948) - Mariachi Leader
Rimfire (1949) - Chico
The Beautiful Blonde from Bashful Bend (1949) - Joe
Borderline (1950) - Pepe - Hotel Clerk (uncredited)
The Arizona Cowboy (1950) - Café Owner Pedro
The Lady from Texas (1951) - José
A Millionaire for Christy (1951) - Manolo, Fat Mexican
Ride the Man Down (1952) - Chris
San Antone (1953) - Ramon, Vaquero (uncredited)
Mesa of Lost Women (1953) - Pepe (final film role)

References

External links

1893 births
1953 deaths
American male film actors
American male actors of Mexican descent
Male actors from Tucson, Arizona
20th-century American male actors
Male Western (genre) film actors